Devil's apple is a common name for several horny plants and may refer to:

Datura
Podophyllum peltatum, native to North America
Solanum, several species which are invasive in Australia, including:
Solanum capsicoides
Solanum linnaeanum